Agerinia is a genus of adapiform primate that lived in Europe during the early Eocene. Fossils have been found in the Grès d'Assignan, Lignites de Soissonais, and Calcare d'Agel Formations of France, the Corçà and Escanilla Formations of Spain and the Kuldana Formation of Pakistan.

References

Bibliography 

 

Prehistoric strepsirrhines
Prehistoric primate genera
Eocene primates
Eocene mammals of Asia
Fossils of Pakistan
Eocene mammals of Europe
Fossils of France
Fossils of Spain
Fossil taxa described in 1973